The Chicago Vultures were an indoor soccer club based in Chicago, Illinois that competed in the American Indoor Soccer Association.

After their first season, the club was renamed the Chicago Shoccers.

Coaches

Luis Dabo 1985–1986 
Aleks Mihailovic 1986 
Dave Huson 1986 
Mike Grbic 1986–1987

Year-by-year

Sh
Soccer clubs in Illinois
Defunct indoor soccer clubs in the United States
American Indoor Soccer Association teams
1984 establishments in Illinois
1987 disestablishments in Illinois
Association football clubs established in 1984
Association football clubs disestablished in 1987